Oudna Airfield is an abandoned World War II military airfield in Tunisia, which was located approximately  southwest of La Mohammedia,  south-southwest of Tunis It was used by the United States Army Air Force Twelfth Air Force during the North African Campaign as a heavy B-17 Flying Fortress bomber airfield.  Known units assigned were:

 99th Bombardment Group, 4 August-11 December 1943, B-17 Flying Fortress (12AF/15AF after 1 November 1943)
 301st Bombardment Group, 6 August-7 December 1943, B-17 Flying Fortress (12AF/15AF after 1 November 1943)

Today, the airfield is nearly indistinguishable from the agricultural fields in the area. A faint outline of dispersal pads and taxiways, along with a single-lane agricultural road which is the remnant of the main runway, are visible in aerial photography.

See also
 Boeing B-17 Flying Fortress airfields in the Mediterranean Theater of Operations

References

 Maurer, Maurer. Air Force Combat Units of World War II. Maxwell AFB, Alabama: Office of Air Force History, 1983. .
 

Airfields of the United States Army Air Forces in Tunisia
Airfields of the Fifteenth Air Force during World War II
Airports established in 1943